Lavan Island (traditionally known as hidden pearl island or Sheikh Shoeyb island) is an Iranian island in the Persian Gulf. The island has one of the four major terminals for export of crude oil in Iran alongside  Kharg island. Lavan island sits on top of Lavan gas field, containing  of gas. Administratively, the island forms part of the Lavan Rural District in Kish District, Bandar Lengeh County, Hormozgan Province. The island is served by Lavan Airport.

See also

List of lighthouses in Iran
Bandar Lengeh
Laz, Iran

References

Islands of Iran
Bandar Lengeh County
Landforms of Hormozgan Province
Lighthouses in Iran